The Western Hockey League (WHL) is a major junior ice hockey league based in Western Canada and the Northwestern United States. The WHL is one of three leagues that constitutes the Canadian Hockey League (CHL) as the highest level of junior hockey in Canada. Teams play for the Ed Chynoweth Cup, with the winner moving on to play for the Memorial Cup, Canada's national junior championship. WHL teams have won the Memorial Cup 19 times since the league became eligible to compete for the trophy. Many players have been drafted from WHL teams, and have found success at various levels of professional hockey, including the National Hockey League (NHL).

The league was founded in 1966, as the Canadian Major Junior Hockey League (CMJHL), with seven western Canadian teams in Saskatchewan and Alberta. For its 1967 season, the league was renamed the Western Canada Junior Hockey League (WCJHL). From 1968, the league was renamed the Western Canada Hockey League (WCHL), before the admission of American-based teams in the league and then renaming as the Western Hockey League (WHL) commencing in 1978, up to present day.

The league was the brainchild of Bill Hunter, who intended to build a western league capable of competing with the top leagues in Ontario and Quebec. Originally considered an "outlaw league" by the Canadian Amateur Hockey Association, it was not sanctioned as the top junior league in Western Canada until 1970, when Canadian junior hockey was reorganized.

The WHL is composed of 22 teams as of 2019, divided into two conferences of two divisions. The Eastern Conference comprises 12 teams from Manitoba, Saskatchewan and Alberta, while the Western Conference comprises ten teams from British Columbia, and the American states of Washington and Oregon.

History

Formative seasons 

Despite winning the 1966 Memorial Cup, the Edmonton Oil Kings' owner, Bill Hunter, was growing concerned about the state of junior hockey in western Canada. Each of the West's four provinces had its own junior league, and Hunter felt that this put them at a disadvantage when competing nationally against the powerful leagues in Ontario and Quebec. Desiring stronger competition, Hunter's Oil Kings competed in the Alberta Senior Hockey League rather than the Alberta Junior Hockey League. During the 1966 Memorial Cup, Hunter made newspaper headlines when he stated his vision for a nation-wide junior ice hockey league competing for the Memorial Cup. The Canadian Amateur Hockey Association (CAHA) second vice-president Lloyd Pollock responded by saying that the idea would be nothing more than a pipe dream, and would not be feasible while the CAHA was renegotiating a development agreement with the National Hockey League.

The CAHA informed the Oil Kings, which then competed against men in the senior-level Central Alberta Hockey League, that they were required to play in a junior hockey league for the 1966–67 season or would be held ineligible to compete for the Memorial Cup. This led Hunter to form a new junior league with five members of the then-version of the Saskatchewan Junior Hockey League (SJHL), the Estevan Bruins, Regina Pats, Saskatoon Blades, Moose Jaw Canucks, and Weyburn Red Wings leaving the SJHL and joining the Oil Kings and the Calgary Buffaloes in a new league known as the Canadian Major Junior Hockey League. Despite concerns that CMJHL would see the demise of the Alberta and Saskatchewan leagues (the SJHL did immediately fold), the governing bodies in both provinces sanctioned the new league. The CAHA did not, however, sanction the new league, declaring the CMJHL to be an "outlaw league" and suspending all teams and players from participation in CAHA sanctioned events, including the Memorial Cup. The new league accused the CAHA of overstepping its boundaries and with the support of the players and their families, chose to play the season regardless. The CMJHL began legal action against the CAHA executive in March 1967, fighting to regain eligibility to enter the Memorial Cup playoffs.

In May 1967, the CMJHL renamed itself to the Western Canada Junior Hockey League (WCJHL), having previously avoided the term "Western" as some of its founders wanted to keep open the possibility of inviting top Eastern junior clubs to join in a national elite junior league in case negotiations with the CAHA reached a complete impasse. The new CAHA-NHL development agreement came into effect July 1, 1967. The new pact ended direct sponsorship of junior teams by the NHL, which then shifted to paying development fees to the CAHA, and junior players became eligible for the NHL Entry Draft at age 20. In May 1968, Bill Hunter announced the league would use an age limit of 21 in defiance of the CAHA and NHL agreement. The WCJHL stopped short of declaring independence from the CAHA, and claimed that the lower age limit would decrease its talent pool and negatively affect ticket sales. In response, the CAHA suspended league and its players.

On June 10, 1968, the WCJHL announced a name change to the Western Canada Hockey League (WCHL), and that it was leaving the CAHA to affiliate with the rival Canadian Hockey Association (CHA). Hunter became chairman of the board for the WCHL, and Ron Butlin became president of the WCHL and the CHA. Four new teams were added in 1968 to total 11 as the league stretched east into Manitoba. Concerns over the WCHL's relationship with the CAHA led the Pats, Canucks and Red Wings to withdraw before the 1968–69 season, and join the new Saskatchewan Junior Hockey League.

When the CAHA reorganized junior hockey in 1971, it reunited with the WCHL making it one of three Tier I Major-Junior leagues, along with the Ontario Hockey Association's Tier I division (now the Ontario Hockey League) and the Quebec Major Junior Hockey League.

Logo timeline

Early years 

The first decade of the WCHL saw constant expansion and franchise movement as the league spread throughout the West. The Flin Flon Bombers became the league's first powerhouse team, led by future NHL stars Bobby Clarke and Reggie Leach. The Brandon Wheat Kings and Swift Current Broncos joined in 1967, the Medicine Hat Tigers in 1970. The WCHL truly became a western league in 1971 when the Estevan team moved to B.C. to become the New Westminster Bruins, joined by expansion franchises the Victoria Cougars and Vancouver Nats.

In the mid-1970s, the New Westminster Bruins became the WCHL's first true dynasty, capturing four consecutive championships between 1975 and 1978. The Bruins also won back-to-back Memorial Cups in 1977 and 1978.

In 1976, the Oil Kings succumbed to the competing Edmonton Oilers of the World Hockey Association and relocated to Portland to become the Winter Hawks, the WCHL's first American franchise. With the addition of American teams in Seattle and Billings a year later, the WCHL shortened its name to the Western Hockey League.

The Brawling '80s 
The 1980s were marked by several brawls that involved police intervention, one of the most bizarre trades in hockey history, and the tragic deaths of four players in a bus crash.

Early in the 1980–81 WHL season, Medicine Hat Tigers GM/Coach Pat Ginnell traded blows with a linesman during a bench clearing brawl against the Lethbridge Broncos. Ginnell was found guilty of assault, fined $360, and suspended for 36 games by the WHL. In March 1982 a violent brawl between the Regina Pats and Calgary Wranglers saw the two teams collectively fined $2250 and players suspended for 73 games combined. Pats coach Bill LaForge would end up in a courtroom later that season when he got into an altercation with a fan. LaForge was acquitted when the judge noted that it was hard to convict a man for assault when faced with "an obnoxious person trying to get into the coach's area." LaForge resigned following the season after serving three separate suspensions.

On January 19, 1983, the Seattle Breakers dealt Tom Martin and $35,000 to the Victoria Cougars for the Cougars' team bus. The deal made perfect sense upon further examination: the Breakers were unable to sign Martin, who wanted to play in his home town of Victoria, and the Cougars were unable to use the bus (which they had purchased from the folded Spokane Flyers) because they were unwilling to pay the taxes and duties required to register the vehicle in Canada.

On December 30, 1986, tragedy struck the Swift Current Broncos when their bus slid off an icy highway and rolled on the way to Regina for a game. Scott Kruger, Trent Kresse, Brent Ruff, and Chris Mantyka were killed. The Broncos retired their numbers, and  still wear a commemorative patch in remembrance of the four players who died. The WHL later renamed its award for most valuable player as the Four Broncos Memorial Trophy in their honour.

The 1990s to today 

Since the early 1990s, the WHL has seen another period of expansion and the return of the league to Western Canada's major cities. The Kamloops Blazers became the WHL's second dynasty in the early 1990s when they won both the WHL Championship and Memorial Cup three times in four years between 1992 and 1995. The Kelowna Rockets became the third dynasty, winning three WHL titles in 2003, 2005, and 2009; and winning the Memorial Cup as host city in 2004. The Portland Winter Hawks won their second Memorial Cup in 1998.

In 1995, the Calgary Hitmen, founded by a group of investors including Bret "the Hitman" Hart from whom the team got its name, were granted an expansion franchise. Despite early fears that the WHL could not succeed in an NHL city, the Hitmen were a success, averaging as many as 10,000 fans per game in 2004–05. The Hitmen were followed one year later by the Edmonton Ice, but that team failed after only two seasons because of conflicts with the Edmonton Oilers. The team became the Kootenay Ice and had better success in Cranbrook, British Columbia, including winning the 2002 Memorial Cup, despite being one of the smallest markets in the league.

In the 2000s, the league expanded with four more teams — the Vancouver Giants in 2001, the Everett Silvertips in 2003, the Chilliwack Bruins in 2005 (who relocated in 2011 to become the Victoria Royals), and the Edmonton Oil Kings in 2007, as the Oilers have taken an interest in cultivating a junior team within their home market in the Alberta capital.

Since 2006 Shaw TV has become the television partner with the league in Canada airing a game every Friday night and other select games throughout the season as well as one round of every playoff series. From 2008 to 2015, FSN Northwest (now Root Sports Northwest) aired some games throughout the northwest United States.

On February 21, 2011, the Calgary Hitmen hosted the Regina Pats, Canada's oldest major junior hockey team, at McMahon Stadium for an outdoor game in conjunction with the 2011 Heritage Classic. The WHL teams wore retro inspired jerseys. The Spokane Chiefs also hosted the Kootenay Ice outdoors on January 15, 2011. The 2010–11 season was the first for the league to be featured in video game, EA Sports' NHL 11, and included all the teams and rosters.

On January 29, 2019, the Kootenay Ice announced the team would be relocated to Winnipeg for the 2019–20 season as the Winnipeg Ice.

Member teams
For the 2021–22 season, the WHL comprises 22 teams divided into two conferences, making it the largest league in the CHL; the Ontario Hockey League has 20 teams and the Quebec Major Junior Hockey League has 18. The WHL has member teams across four Canadian provinces and two American states. The Eastern Conference comprises teams from Manitoba, Saskatchewan, and Alberta. The Western Conference is made up of teams based in British Columbia, Washington, and Oregon.

The top eight teams in each conference qualify for the playoffs, with the division winners declared the top two seeds in the first round of the post-season. The four remaining teams in each conference are reseeded by regular season points in the second round of the playoffs. The Saskatoon Blades, one of the original WHL teams, are the only team to never have won a league championship since their inception in 1966.

Timeline of franchises (since 1966)

Franchise history
Calgary Buffaloes (1966–67) → Calgary Centennials (1967–77) → Billings Bighorns (1977–82) → Nanaimo Islanders (1982–83) → New Westminster Bruins (1983–88) → Tri-City Americans (1988–present)
Edmonton Oil Kings (1966–76) → Portland Winterhawks (1976–present)
Estevan Bruins (1966–71) → New Westminster Bruins (1971–81) → Kamloops Junior Oilers (1981–84) → Kamloops Blazers (1984–present)
Moose Jaw Canucks (1966–68)
Regina Pats (1966–68, 1970–present)
Saskatoon Blades (1966–present) 
Weyburn Red Wings (1966–68)
 Brandon Wheat Kings (1967–present)
Flin Flon Bombers (1967–78) → Edmonton Oil Kings (1978–79) → Great Falls Americans (1979–80) → Spokane Flyers (1980–82)
Swift Current Broncos (1967–74) → Lethbridge Broncos (1974–86) → Swift Current Broncos (1986–present)
Winnipeg Jets (1967–73) → Winnipeg Clubs (1973–76) → Winnipeg Monarchs (1976–77) → Calgary Wranglers (1977–87) → Lethbridge Hurricanes (1987–present)
Medicine Hat Tigers (1970–present)
Vancouver Nats (1971–73) → Kamloops Chiefs (1973–77) → Seattle Breakers (1977–85) → Seattle Thunderbirds (1985–present)
Victoria Cougars (1971–94) → Prince George Cougars (1994–present)
Winnipeg Warriors (1980–84) → Moose Jaw Warriors (1984–present)
Kelowna Wings (1982–85) → Spokane Chiefs (1985–present)
Prince Albert Raiders (1982–present)
Tacoma Rockets (1991–95) → Kelowna Rockets (1995–present)
Red Deer Rebels (1992–present)
Calgary Hitmen (1995–present)
Edmonton Ice (1996–98) → Kootenay Ice (1998–2019) → Winnipeg Ice (2019–present)
Vancouver Giants (2001–present)
Everett Silvertips (2003–present)
Chilliwack Bruins (2006–11) → Victoria Royals (2011–present)
Edmonton Oil Kings (2007–present)

Education
The WHL has taken a much greater role in its players educational needs in recent years. The league operates a scholarship program that offers one full year of tuition, textbooks and compulsory fees for each season they play in the WHL. Each team maintains an academic advisor, who monitors the academic progress of all players along with the league's Director of Education Services.

Canadian universities and colleges recruit extensively from the WHL, affording graduating players the opportunity to continue playing hockey as they attend post-secondary institutions. The U.S. National Collegiate Athletic Association (NCAA), though, considers graduates of the WHL (and the other two CHL members, the OHL and QMJHL) to be professionals and thus ineligible to participate in college hockey programs in the United States. Players hoping to receive scholarships to, and play for, American universities must play Junior A hockey in one of the Canadian Junior Hockey League's member organizations or the United States Hockey League to retain their NCAA eligibility.

Player eligibility
The WHL Bantam Draft is an annual event which teams select players from bantam hockey league age groups, 14 or 15 years old. The order of selection depends on the final standings of the teams, the last place team selects first the second to last will choose second and so on.

Players aged 15–20 are eligible to play in the WHL, though 15-year-olds are permitted to play only five games unless their midget team's season has ended. Also, each team is allowed to have only three 20-year-olds on their rosters, unless there is an expansion team, in which case five 20-year-olds are eligible to play. Each team is permitted to carry only two non-North American players. Each of the CHL's three member leagues are granted exclusive territorial rights to players from within North America. The WHL holds rights to players from the four western provinces, the U.S. Pacific Northwest, all other U.S. states west of the Mississippi River (except Missouri), and the Yukon, Northwest Territories and Nunavut.

Memorial Cup champions 
The Memorial Cup has been captured by a WHL team 19 times since the league's founding.

Records 
Individual
 Most goals in a season: 108, Ray Ferraro, 1983–84
 Most assists in a season: 136, Rob Brown, 1986–87
 Most points in a season: 212, Rob Brown, 1986–87
 Most penalty minutes in a season: 511, Brent Gogol, 1977–78
 Most points in a season, rookie: 145, Petr Nedved, 1989–90
 Most points in a season, defenceman: 140, Cam Plante, 1983–84
 Most hat-tricks in a season: 15, Ray Ferraro, 1983–84
 Most goals in a single game: 7, Five times, last by Kimbi Daniels, 1990–91

Team
 Most wins in a season: 60, Victoria Cougars, 1980–81
 Most wins in an inaugural season: 35, Everett Silvertips, 2003–04
 Most points in a season: 125, Brandon Wheat Kings, 1978–79
 Most goals in a season: 496, Kamloops Blazers, 1986–87
 Fewest goals against in a season: 125, Kelowna Rockets, 2003–04
 Most powerplay goals in a season: 180, Swift Current Broncos, 1988–89

Trophies and awards 

 Ed Chynoweth Cup—playoff champions
 Scotty Munro Memorial Trophy—regular season champions
 Four Broncos Memorial Trophy—player of the year
 Daryl K. (Doc) Seaman Trophy—scholastic player of the year
 Bob Clarke Trophy—top scorer
 Brad Hornung Trophy—most sportsmanlike player
 Bill Hunter Memorial Trophy—top defencemen
 Jim Piggott Memorial Trophy—rookie of the year
 Del Wilson Trophy—top goaltender
 Dunc McCallum Memorial Trophy—coach of the year
 Lloyd Saunders Memorial Trophy—executive of the year
 Allen Paradice Memorial Trophy—top official
 St. Clair Group Trophy—marketing/public relations award
 Doug Wickenheiser Memorial Trophy—humanitarian of the year
 WHL Plus-Minus Award
 airBC Trophy—most valuable player in the playoffs

Commissioners 
 Frank Boucher (Commissioner) – 1966–1968
 Ron Butlin (President) – 1968–1971
 Jim Piggott (President) & Tom Fisher (Executive Secretary) – 1971–1972
 Del Wilson (President) & Tom Fisher (Executive Secretary) – 1972–1973 – 1973 was transition period to Chynoweth & League office in Saskatoon
 Ed Chynoweth (President) – 1973–1979
 David Descent (President) – 1979–1980 – resigned March 3, Board of Governors for balance of season
 Ed Chynoweth (President) – 1980–1995
 Dev Dley (Commissioner) – 1995–2000
 Ron Robison (Commissioner) – 2000–present

See also 
 List of ice hockey leagues
 Ontario Hockey League
 Quebec Major Junior Hockey League

References 
General

Specific

External links 
 Official website
 Official website of the Canadian Hockey League

 
Sports leagues established in 1966
1
Junior ice hockey leagues in the United States
1966 establishments in Canada